The Saharsa–Barauni Express is an Express train belonging to East Central Railway zone that runs between  and  in India. It is currently being operated with 15275/15276 train numbers on a daily basis.

Service

The 15275/Saharsa–Barauni Express has an average speed of 38 km/hr and covers 107 km in 2h 50m. The 15276/Barauni–Saharsa Express has an average speed of 29 km/hr and covers 107 km in 3h 40m.

Route and halts 

The important halts of the train are:

Coach composition

The train has standard ICF rakes with a max speed of 110 kmph. The train consists of 22 coaches:

 20 General Unreserved
 2 Seating cum Luggage Rake

Traction

Both trains are hauled by a Samastipur Loco Shed-based WDM-3A diesel locomotive from Barauni to Saharsa and vice versa.

Rake sharing

The train shares its rake with 15211/15212 Jan Nayak Express.

See also 

 Barauni Junction railway station
 Saharsa Junction railway station
 Jan Nayak Express

Notes

References

External links 

 15275/Saharsa - Barauni Express
 15276/Barauni - Saharsa Express

Transport in Saharsa
Transport in Barauni
Express trains in India
Rail transport in Bihar